Statistics of Liberian Premier League for the 2000–01 season.

Overview
It was contested by 18 teams, and Mighty Barrolle won the championship.

Group stage

Group A

Group B

Final

Football competitions in Liberia
Lea
Lea